Chinese Daily News may refer to the following:

 The English subtitle of the World Journal, in North America.
 The former name of the United Daily, Sarawak Tribune's sister newspaper, in Malaysia.

See also 
 China Daily News (disambiguation)